Cozy Powell (born Colin Trevor Flooks; 29 December 1947 – 5 April 1998) was an English rock drummer who made his name with major rock bands and artists such as The Jeff Beck Group, Rainbow, Michael Schenker Group, Gary Moore, Robert Plant, Brian May, Whitesnake, Emerson, Lake & Powell, and Black Sabbath.

Powell appeared on at least 66 albums, with contributions on many other recordings. Many rock drummers have cited him as a major influence.

Early life
Colin Flooks (Cozy Powell) was born in Cirencester, Gloucestershire, and was adopted. He never knowingly met his birth parents. He started playing drums aged 12 in the school orchestra, thereafter playing along in his spare time to popular singles of the day. The first band Powell was in, called the Corals, played each week at the youth club in Cirencester. During this time the band broke the world record for non-stop playing. Aged 15, Cozy had already worked out an impressive drum solo. The stage name Cozy was borrowed from the jazz drummer Cozy Cole. The Corals also played at a youth club in Latton, a small village  from Cirencester.

Career

The semi-professional circuit was next with The Sorcerers, a vocal-harmony pop band. The late nights and usual on-the-road exploits began to affect his education, and Powell left to take an office job to finance the purchase of his first set of Premier drums. The Sorcerers performed in the German club scene of the 1960s.

By 1968 the band had returned to England, basing themselves in the Birmingham area. Powell struck up friendships with notable local musicians, including Robert Plant, John Bonham, future Slade vocalist Noddy Holder, bassist Dave Pegg and Tony Iommi. The Sorcerers, then renamed Youngblood, released a series of singles in late 1968 and 1969. The group then linked up with The Move's bassist/singer Ace Kefford to form The Ace Kefford Stand. Five recorded tracks are available on the Ace Kefford album Ace The Face, released by Sanctuary Records in 2003. Powell also began session work and, with fellow Sorcerers Dave and Denny Ball, formed Big Bertha.

Isle of Wight 1970 and Jeff Beck

Powell also played with swamp rocker Tony Joe White at the Isle of Wight Festival 1970. Powell landed the then highly prestigious drumming job with Jeff Beck's group in April 1970. Their first project was to record an album of Motown covers in the USA. This was never finished and remains unreleased. During the sessions, photographs show Cozy Powell and Jeff Beck present at the recording of Stevie Wonder's "Superstition", on which Beck appears. Cozy has stated in interviews he plays on the record, but this remains to be confirmed. After the recording of two albums, Rough and Ready (October 1971) and Jeff Beck Group (July 1972), the band fell apart.

1972–1974

In 1972 Powell drummed for two tracks ("Hey Sandy" and "Martha") on Harvey Andrews' album Writer of Songs. By late 1972 he had joined up with the Ball brothers and singer Frank Aiello to form Bedlam, whose eponymous album was recorded for Chrysalis and released in August 1973.

With Powell's session work at RAK and subsequent solo success  (including "Dance with the Devil", which reached No. 3 in the UK singles chart during January 1974), Bedlam fell apart. "Dance With The Devil" was his only solo hit in the United States, peaking at No. 49. The track featured Suzi Quatro on bass. Powell's second hit during 1974 was with "The Man in Black", which reached No. 18. Arrows front man Alan Merrill, also a RAK records artist, played electric bass on '"The Man in Black'" and the b-side '"After Dark". Jeff Beck's studio producer was Mickie Most and Powell soon found himself drafted into sessions for artists signed to Most's RAK label, including Julie Felix, Hot Chocolate, Donovan and Suzi Quatro. To cash in on his chart success, the drummer formed "Cozy Powell's Hammer" in April 1974. The line-up included Bernie Marsden (guitar), Clive Chaman (bass), Don Airey (keyboards) and Frank Aiello (Bedlam) on vocals. Clive Chaman was replaced on bass by Neil Murray in the band in early 1975 for the RAK Rocks Britain Tour. "Na Na Na" was a UK No. 10 hit, and another single "Le Souk" was recorded but never released.
Sharing a love of the power-trio set up (Cream), Cozy Powell formed a band with guitarist Clem Clempson and bassist Greg Ridley (Humble Pie), but when this fell apart Cozy temporarily quit the music business to take up motorcycle racing. His desire to launch a three-piece in the vein of Cream remained; recordings with Tipton, Entwistle & Powell are testament to this as much as sessions with Cream's Jack Bruce and on guitar Uli Jon Roth, briefly after recording for Cinderella: "to get him (Uli Roth) had been the idea of Larry Mazor (at the time manager of Cinderella), Jack met him, but at the time Uli was busy with a symphony. I don't think it would have worked, we had him in mind as well as some other people, like Gary Moore, ideally Jeff Beck really", followed by Clem Clempson, Pat Travers and Pat Thrall with whom they recorded, shopped for a deal - unsuccessfully—until Powell would join Black Sabbath.

1975–1980: Rainbow

In 1975 Powell joined Rainbow and over the next five years he and guitarist Ritchie Blackmore were the only constants in the band's line-up. Rainbow's 1979 album, Down to Earth, featured Graham Bonnet on vocals and included the singles "Since You Been Gone" and "All Night Long", which reached number 6 and number 5 on the UK charts respectively. During this time, Blackmore evolved the sound of the band from a neo-classical hard rock-heavy metal to a more commercial AOR sound. This proved to be the band's most successful album to date. However, Powell was concerned with the overtly commercial direction of the band and decided to leave Rainbow, although not before they headlined the first Monsters of Rock show at Castle Donington, England, on 16 August 1980. The festival was Powell's last show with the band.

1980–1983: Bonnet, Michael Schenker, Phenomena

After leaving Rainbow, Powell again worked with vocalist Graham Bonnet, their most notable single being "Night Games" from Bonnet's solo album Line-Up, which reached number 6 in the UK singles chart. For the rest of the 1980s, Powell assumed short-term journeyman roles with a number of major bands including The Michael Schenker Group. In 1985 he started recording with Phenomena for their self-titled first album, which was released the same year. He also worked briefly with another new supergroup named Forcefield along with Bonnet and later Tony Martin on vocals, former Ian Gillan Band member Ray Fenwick and former Focus member Jan Akkerman on the guitars, Neil Murray and later Laurence Cottle on bass. Cottle would eventually join as a session player for the recording of Black Sabbath's Headless Cross and again was replaced by Murray following that tour.

1982–1985: Whitesnake

Powell was invited to join Whitesnake in late of 1982 after his departure from Michael Schenker Group to replace Ian Paice for a presumed farewell tour with the band in Europe, but after the success of the Saints & Sinners album in the British and Japanese charts, and a successful tour that culminated in a memorable performance at the Monsters of Rock Festival in August 1983, the band signed with the American label Geffen Records. Due to contractual obligations, the band had to release one more album for their previous label Liberty which would be 1984's Slide It In. Now under guidance of A&R executive John Kalodner the album was remixed with the help of producer Keith Olsen for the American market with Cozy, guitarist Mel Galley and keyboardist Jon Lord the only remaining members of the previous line up along with singer David Coverdale. Powell's tenure with the band ended in the summer of 1985, as he was offered to join Keith Emerson and Greg Lake in a revamped version of ELP.

1988–1998: Black Sabbath and solo
Powell worked with Gary Moore in 1988, followed by stints with Black Sabbath from 1988 to 1991, and again in 1994–1995. Between late 1992 and early 1993, Powell put together an occasional touring band using the old band name 'Cozy Powell's Hammer' featuring himself on drums, Neil Murray on bass, Mario Parga on guitar and Tony Martin on vocals and occasional rhythm guitar/synth module. The band performed throughout Europe and appeared on German television. Powell made headlines in 1991 when he appeared on the BBC children's programme Record Breakers, where he set a world record for the most drums (400) played in under one minute, live on television.

Powell along with Neil Murray were members of Brian May's band, playing on the Back to the Light and Another World albums. He  played with May opening for Guns N' Roses on the second American leg of their Use Your Illusion tour in 1993. The duo also served a spell with blues guitarist Peter Green in the mid-nineties. Powell briefly joined Yngwie Malmsteen for the album Facing the Animal in 1997. Powell's last recording session was for Colin Blunstone's The Light Inside, alongside Don Airey, which was released shortly after Powell's death. The final solo album by Cozy Powell Especially for You was released in 1998 after his death, and featured American vocalist John West, Neil Murray, Lonnie Park, Michael Casswell and others.

Death
He had been dating a married woman who was having problems with her husband. As he was driving to her house, she phoned him again and asked "Where are you?" He informed her he was on his way and she then heard him say "Oh shit!" followed by a loud bang.

Powell was ejected through the windscreen and died at the scene. According to the BBC report, at the time of the crash Powell's blood-alcohol reading was over the legal limit, and he was not wearing a seat belt, in addition to talking with his girlfriend on his mobile phone. The official investigation also found evidence of a slow puncture in a rear tyre that, it was suggested, could well have caused a sudden collapse of the tyre with a consequent loss of control of the car.

He was living in Lambourn in Berkshire at the time and had returned to the studio shortly before his death to record with Fleetwood Mac founder Peter Green. At the time of death, Powell had recently pulled out of tour rehearsals with Yngwie Malmsteen, having suffered an injury in a motorcycle accident. One of his last phone calls, to Joe Geesin (his fan club editor), was to express distress about this, to describe the physiotherapy treatment he was undergoing, and to voice his enthusiasm for the then-forthcoming Brian May tour.

A memorial plaque in Cirencester was unveiled on 7 January 2016, in a ceremony led by Brian May, with Suzi Quatro, Bernie Marsden, Neil Murray, Don Airey and Tony Iommi in attendance.

Posthumous releases
In October 2005, Powell made a "new" appearance on an album. Former Black Sabbath vocalist Tony Martin released a studio album (Scream), and on it is a track named "Raising Hell". This was a track Powell had recorded the drum track for when he and Martin were in Hammer in 1992, and gave to Martin for "future use". There are apparently as many as 19 additional drum tracks also recorded that could turn up in the future. Judas Priest guitarist Glenn Tipton has also released material recorded during the 1997 Baptizm of Fire sessions; this 2006 collection, entitled Edge of the World, was released under the moniker of Tipton, Entwistle & Powell in memory of John Entwistle and Powell.

Band timeline (not including session work)
Text in bold indicates solo work
 The Sorcerers (1967–1968)
 Youngblood (1968–1969)
 The Ace Kefford Stand (1969)
 Big Bertha (1969–1970)
 The Jeff Beck Group (1970–1972)
 Bedlam (1972–1973)
 Cozy Powell (1973–1974, 1979–1983, 1992)
 Cozy Powell's Hammer (1974, 1992–1993)
 Rainbow (1975–1980)
 Graham Bonnet (1980–1981)
 Michael Schenker Group (1980–1982)
 Whitesnake (1982–1985)
 Emerson, Lake & Powell (1985–1986)
 Pete York/Cozy Powell (1987)
 Black Sabbath (1988–1991, 1994–1995)
 The Brian May Band (1991–1992, 1993–1994, 1998)
 Peter Green Splinter Group (1997–1998)
 Tipton, Entwistle and Powell (1997)
 Yngwie Malmsteen (1997)
 The Snakes (1998)

Discography

Guest appearances and sessions
Tony Joe White – Swamp Music: The Complete Monument Recordings (2006) – Live at the Isle of Wight Festival 1970
Ed Welch – Clowns (1971)
Harvey Andrews – Writer of Songs (1972)
Julie Felix – Clotho's Web (1972)
Donovan – Cosmic Wheels (1973)
Chick Churchill – You and Me (1973)
Murray Head – Nigel Lived (1973)
Tony Ashton and Jon Lord – First of the Big Bands (1974)
Bob Sargeant – The First Starring Role (1974)
Peter Sarstedt – Every Word You Say (1975)
Various – Peter & The Wolf (1976) - including Phil Collins, Brian Eno, Gary Moore, Alvin Lee, Chris Spedding, etc.
Hot Chocolate – XIV Greatest Hits (1976)
Bernie Marsden – And About Time Too! (1979)
Bernie Marsden – Look at Me Now (1981)
Jon Lord – Before I Forget (1982)
Robert Plant – Pictures at Eleven (1982)
Phenomena – Phenomena (1985)
Roger Daltrey – Under a Raging Moon (1985)
Boys Don't Cry – Who the Am Dam do You Think We Am (1987)
Sanne Salomonsen – Ingen Engel (Danish Version) / No Angel (English Version) (1987)
Warlock – Triumph and Agony (1987)
Pete York – Super Drumming Vol. 1 (1987)
Cinderella – Long Cold Winter (1988)
James Darby – Southern Region Breakdown (1988)
Don Airey – K2 – Tales of Triumph and Tragedy (1988)
Gary Moore – After the War (1989)
Minute By Minute – Timewatch (1989)
Ritchie Blackmore – Rock Profile Vol. 2 (1991)
Various Artists – In From The Storm – The Music of Jimi Hendrix (1995)
Glenn Tipton – Baptizm of Fire (1997)
S.A.S. Band – SAS Band (1997)
Colin Blunstone – The Light Inside (1998)
Ace Kefford – Ace The Face (2003)
Tony Martin – Scream (2005)
Pete York – Super Drumming Vol. 3 (2008)

Motor racing and TV appearances
Powell had a fascination with fast cars and motorbikes, and raced for Hitachi on the UK saloon car circuit for a few months in the mid-seventies. He was quoted as saying in an interview, "I drive like I drum – madly".

See also

Cozy Powell Forever – tribute album to Cozy Powell

References

External links
Official Cozy Powell web site
Bio on Drummerworld.com
BBC obituary

1947 births
1998 deaths
People from Lambourn
People from Cirencester
English rock drummers
English heavy metal drummers
Michael Schenker Group members
Rainbow (rock band) members
Whitesnake members
The Gary Moore Band members
Blue Murder (band) members
Black Sabbath members
English session musicians
Road incident deaths in England
Rak Records artists
Musicians from Gloucestershire
20th-century English musicians
Chrysalis Records artists
The Jeff Beck Group members
Emerson, Lake & Powell members
Yngwie J. Malmsteen's Rising Force members
Peter Green Splinter Group members
Blues rock musicians